Radio One (R1) is the first private radio station in Mauritius, owned and broadcast by Viva Voce Ltd. It started operations in 2002 with a Private Commercial Free to Air FM Radio Broadcasting Licence issued by the Independent Broadcasting Authority- Mauritius. Radio One is popularly known as the news and entertainment radio channel.

Programs

On Weekday 
 Matin Bonheur with Rj Mario
 Le Wake Up Show with Rj Louanna Lodoiska And Rj Andy Bignoux 
 Enquêtes en Direct  with Annabelle Savabaddy
 Le Club with Rj Miguel and Radio One News Team
 Le13_15 with Rj Daniella
 Le 15-18 with Rj Hassen Rojoa 
 Face A Face / Feature /  Le Dossier / Nu La Vwa Nu Radio with Finlay Salesse, Geraldine Geofroid , Emmanuel Eydou
 TURF TALK with Andy Bignoux, Amize Assad,Shawn Louis
 le Gassel and Frankii with Rj Jimmy & Bigg (Monday & Tuesday)
 Meli-Melo Wednesday with Rj Ursula
 Good Vibes Thursday with Rj Bruno
 Black Friday Friday 8pm-11pm with Rj Louanna / Miss Lou

 On Weekend 
 Le Morning Du Weekend with Rj Corinette
 Polémique with Finlay
 Planet Hits with Rj  Ursula
 100%Hits 80 with Rj Elvis 
 Hit Radio One with Rj Christophe 
 Radio One Football Club with Fabrice Coiffic & Bertrand Herisson
  DJ & CO with Andy & Ruben
 Les Tubes Inoubliables with Rj Elvis
 Dimanche Culture with Rj Finlay
 Zwe Sa La Misik with Rj Mario
 Generation 80's with Rj Elvis
 A State of Trance with Armin Van Buuren
 Club Life with Tiesto
 Planet Perfecto with Paul Oakenfold
 UMF Radio Spinnin' Sessions (various DJs)
During the turf season, Horse racing are commented live on Radio One. ( See also Champ De Mars Racecourse )
Radio One is the exclusive broadcaster of Spinnin sessions, Clublife, ASOT, Planet Perfecto, UMF Radio.

 Legal Matter 
During the Municipal Elections 2012, Radio One along with 2 other radio stations Top FM and Radio Plus received a letter by the Independent Broadcasting Authority listing directives to follow the rules and regulations they owe to follow during the mentioned period. The Chairman of IBA accused Top Fm''' of suspected breaches penalizing the other two private radio in an interview in Le Defi Quotidien but the decision was challenged as Top FM state that they had so far communicated all and requesting the IBA to withdraw the new directives so that Radio Plus and Radio one could continue their phone-in programs.

La Sentinelle (Mauritius), one of the main shareholders of Viva Voce Ltd lost control on Radio One.

See also
List of radio stations in Mauritius

References

Radio stations in Mauritius